Hamper Mill House is a grade II listed house in Hampermill Lane, near Watford in Hertfordshire, England. It was built in the late 18th-century and extended in the late 19th or early 20th-century.

It was once the home of the interior designer Dennis Lennon.

References 

Grade II listed houses in Hertfordshire